Harold James Huxham   was a British colonial financial administrator. He was the  Financial Secretary of Ceylon from 1936 to 1946 and ex-offico member of the Second Board of Ministers of Ceylon.

Honours
1936 Birthday Honours: Companion of the Order of St Michael and St George

References

Companions of the Order of St Michael and St George
British colonial governors and administrators in Asia
Members of the 2nd State Council of Ceylon
People from British Ceylon